Ethics is a work of ethical theory by the Japanese philosopher Tetsuro Watsuji. Steve Odin described Ethics as the premier work of modern Japanese ethical theory.

References

Footnotes

Bibliography

 

1937 non-fiction books
1942 non-fiction books
1949 non-fiction books
Books by Tetsuro Watsuji
Contemporary philosophical literature
Ethics books
Japanese philosophy